PristonTale is a 3D fantasy MMORPG that centers on action-based role-playing. It was originally released in South Korea by Yedang Online in 2001. It was created by Triglow Pictures Inc. (later Priston Inc.) and has since been published for Japan, China, Taiwan, Malaysia, Thailand, Vietnam, Philippines, Brazil and the Spanish-speaking countries. In 2004, the English version of PristonTale went out of public beta (in which it had remained for nearly two years) and became a commercial pay-to-play game. On May 17, 2007, PristonTale announced free-to-play service for everyone; instead of paying for the game, PristonTale has a cash shop in which players can pay real money for game items. On September 30, 2008, the English server for Priston Tale closed; Suba Games opened a new English server three days later. There are more players in the private servers.

Some of the features of PristonTale include a clan system, in-game shops, ten character classes – all of which can use every item available if they have the correct upgraded statistics (with the exception of armour, robes, and orbs) – a five-tiered skill system for each class, item upgrades, a simple yet involving battle system and an easy to use interface. PristonTale is also intensive in potion using, and dying is moderately easy. The experience loss per death also tends to climb quite steeply (experience loss is based on a percentage of obtained experience), mirroring the ever increasing experience needed to level.

Gameplay 
Gameplay mostly consists of leveling up, though there are several activities players can participate in that are essential to the game. Some of these activities are:

 Trading: Buying and selling items. Players usually find this necessary in order to gain money and equipment otherwise unobtainable from NPC merchants.
 Clans: Players can join clans, in which teamwork prevails. They are the core of the social community of the game. Clans can also participate in special events created for clans only. Clans can be made once a player reaches level 40 or higher.
 Bellatra: formerly known as Survive or Die (SoD), a competition in which four teams with members of the same clan are forced to fight monsters until two teams are declared finalists. These two teams will continue fighting monsters until the last one survives. The winning team is chosen by whichever one has the higher number of points. Teams receive points by killing monsters and monster bosses. The Boss monsters give higher numbers of points. The winning team's Clan Chief acquires rights over the Bellatra by gaining the ability to modify the monsters when the Chief fights next, by receiving an income from Bellatra, etc. Bellatra is located in the town Navisko and available for players level 80 and above.
 Bless Castle: Bless Castle is a Player vs. Player activity in which one clan holds and defends the castle from all other participating clans, which can use siege equipment.
 Ghost Castle: Three characters of different classes play together, can be done once a day. Entrance to Ghost Castle is in Garden of Freedom.
 Ardor: Also known as Ricarten SoD, located in the town Ricarten by the exit to Garden of Freedom, this is SoD for players level 40 to level 79.
 Trecor Yalta was known to be the main boss next to Fury 1, 2 & 3

The other aspects of game play are "training", "climbing", hunting, player vs. player fights and socializing.
 Training: A player levels by killing large numbers of monsters at one given time, or many individual monsters quickly. Players may be in "party's" of 2–6 and level together.
 Climbing : One will attempts to move their character in a way that causes s/he to be on top of structures inside the game.
 Hunting: One faces as few as one monster but usually no more than three, to look for certain items in the game.
 Player vs. Player: One goes to a specified area to compete against other players, sometimes only one and sometimes as many as twenty.
 Socializing: Self-explanatory, used in PristonTale to obtain items, throwing friends at enemies and anything else considered of value in the game.

Throughout the game, the characters progress through a series of levels and acquire skill points. As they progress they get different items, such as weapons and armour, to help them in their quest of achieving the ultimate warrior. Items of this calibre usually require a larger number of skill points in an area than the previous items. Armour in general helps the character stay alive longer by giving them different attributes. Weapons in general help the character defend themselves or attack any monster they wish with a lot more force.

At the same time, there are certain specifications as to when players may use such weapons and armour. These are mostly based on level and stat requirements. Also, there are certain specs for armour and weapons so that they may achieve their great performance and special stats. These may be found in game, written on the armour or weapon (e.g. Fighter Spec, Knight Spec, etc.). Different Classes use different weapons; for example, the knight mainly uses two-handed swords and blades, whereas the Archer uses bows. The different items players may obtain with specs determine which types of character classes use them. Most swords will come as Knight or Mechanician spec when most wands/staves will come as Magician Spec or Priestess Spec.

At higher level's obtaining items can become quite difficult due to low supply and high demand for the "high level" items. Magic characters such a Priestess and Magician will find the market for their items is less competitive. Whereas the melee characters such as Fighter, Pikeman, and Knight have a higher rate of competition for items.

Reception 

PristonTale received an award for "Outstanding Online Game" in December 2002 and "Outstanding Programming" at the 2003 Korean Gaming Grand Ceremony.

Priston Tale II

The sequel to Priston Tale was released in February 2008. The developers sought to take the basic concepts of the first game and improve upon them. The development team stated at one point that they were "inexperienced" and had "learnt a lot" from the first version and that the second has had much better planning. Screenshots of the new game from E3 2006 depicted many recognizable characters, enemies, and environments, albeit altered significantly. It uses Unreal Engine.

As of 2008, Priston Tale 2 has only been released outside of beta in South Korea. Player response in South Korea has been very good, with over 30,000 players online, playing simultaneously on the first day of open beta, and 40,000 players online simultaneously as of the third day. The game still maintains popularity and is competing with SP1 and Twelve Skies for market share, with tens of thousands of players online simultaneously at any given time.

Yedang Online has contracted with various publishers, and localized versions (including North America) will begin beta service in early to mid-2009. The European closed beta of Priston Tale II was released in October 2008. The open beta was released February 14, 2009 although access to the European open beta is subject to regional restrictions via an IP block on the login server. As of March 2013 English server of Priston Tale II closed down.

References

External links 
English official website
Pristontale EU spin-off official website
Wartale spin-off official website

2001 video games
Fantasy massively multiplayer online role-playing games
Massively multiplayer online role-playing games
Unreal Engine games
Video games developed in South Korea
Windows-only games
Windows games
Suba Games games